Ryan York Anderson (born July 12, 1979) is an American former professional baseball player.  Anderson was a left-handed pitcher in the Seattle Mariners and Milwaukee Brewers minor league system from 1997 to his release in 2005.

Career
After attending Divine Child High School, Anderson was drafted in the first round by the Mariners and was listed as the club's top prospect by Baseball America every year from 1998 to 2002, and the top prospect in the Pacific Coast League in 2000.

After a series of injuries (which prevented him from pitching from 2001–2004) and questions regarding his work ethic and diligence, Anderson retired from baseball after briefly attempting a comeback within the Brewers' farm system in 2005.

He is now pursuing a career as a chef after attending the Scottsdale Culinary Institute.

Personal life
At 6'10, Anderson drew frequent comparisons to former Mariners pitcher Randy Johnson due to similarities in their height and pitching style, and earned Anderson the nickname "The Little Unit," a play on Johnson's nickname "The Big Unit."

References

External links

1979 births
Living people
Arizona League Brewers players
Baseball players from Michigan
Baseball players at the 1999 Pan American Games
Brevard County Manatees players
New Haven Ravens players
Pan American Games medalists in baseball
Pan American Games silver medalists for the United States
Tacoma Rainiers players
United States national baseball team players
Wisconsin Timber Rattlers players
Medalists at the 1999 Pan American Games